Beverly Lowry (born August 10, 1938) is an American educator, novelist and short story writer.

Biography
The daughter of David Leonard Fey and Dora Smith, both natives of Arkansas, she was born Beverly Fey in Memphis, Tennessee and grew up in Greenville, Mississippi. She was educated at the University of Mississippi and Memphis State University, receiving a BA from the latter institution in 1960. In 1960, she married Glenn Lowry and moved to Manhattan. In 1965, the family moved to Houston and she began writing. In 1976, Lowry began teaching fiction writing at the University of Houston.

In 1977, she published her first novel Come Back, Lolly Ray. This was followed by Emma Blue in 1978. In 1981, she published Daddy's Girl, which won the Jesse Jones Award from the Texas Institute of Letters. Her short story "So far from the Road, So Long until Morning" won the Texas Institute of Letters short story award in that year.

In the 1990s, Lowry moved to Los Angeles. She taught at George Mason University. She has served as president of the Texas Institute of Letters.

Awards 
 1979-80  National Endowment for the Arts fellow

Selected works 
 The Perfect Sonya (1987)
 Breaking Gentle (1988)
 Crossed Over : A Murder, A Memoir (1992), based in part on the story of Karla Faye Tucker
 The Track of Real Desires (1992)
 Her Dream of Dreams: The Rise and Triumph of Madam CJ Walker (2002)
 Mother of the Disappeared: An Appalachian Birth Mother's Journey (2003), received the AWP award in 2003
 Who Killed These Girls? (2016)

References 

1938 births
Living people
American women novelists
American women short story writers
20th-century American novelists
21st-century American novelists
People from Memphis, Tennessee
People from Greenville, Mississippi
University of Mississippi alumni
University of Memphis alumni
University of Houston faculty
George Mason University faculty
Writers from Houston
Writers from Los Angeles
20th-century American women writers
21st-century American women writers
20th-century American short story writers
21st-century American short story writers
Novelists from Texas
Novelists from Virginia
American women academics